Douglas J. Johnson (August 17, 1942 – November 7, 2022) was an American politician in the state of Minnesota.

Johnson was born in Cook, Minnesota and graduated from Cook High School. He received his associate degree from Virginia Community College (now Mesabi Range College) and his bachelor's degree from University of Minnesota Duluth. He also received his master's degree from University of Wisconsin–Superior. Johnson was a high school guidance counselor. He served as the mayor of Cook, Minnesota and was a Democrat. Johnson served in the Minnesota House of Representatives from 1971 to 1976 and in the Minnesota State Senate from 1977 to 2002. Johnson, his wife, and family lived in Tower, Minnesota.

References

1942 births
2022 deaths
Democratic Party Minnesota state senators
Democratic Party members of the Minnesota House of Representatives
Mayors of places in Minnesota
People from St. Louis County, Minnesota
Educators from Minnesota
University of Minnesota Duluth alumni
University of Wisconsin–Superior alumni
20th-century American politicians
20th-century American educators
21st-century American politicians